Meurig (also known as Maurice) (died 1161) was a Welsh  cleric who was Bishop of Bangor from 1139 to 1161.

Meurig continued the rebuilding of Bangor Cathedral.

Notes

1161 deaths
Bishops of Bangor
12th-century Roman Catholic bishops in Wales
Year of birth unknown
12th-century Welsh clergy
Welsh bishops